The World’s Children’s Prize for the Rights of the Child was founded in 2000 and is run by the World's Children's Prize Foundation (WCPF), based in Mariefred, Sweden. 

The WCPF is a non-profit organisation, independent of all political and religious affiliation, and run with support from bodies including the Swedish Postcode Lottery and the Swedish International Development Cooperation Agency.

Patrons 
Patrons of the World's Children's Prize include Malala Yousafzai, the late Nelson Mandela from South Africa, Democracy Champion, and Freedom Fighter Xanana Gusmão, from East Timor. Its patrons also include Queen Silvia of Sweden, Graça Machel and Desmond Tutu. Artists Loreen and Vusi "The Voice" Mahlasele are also patrons.

Laureates 
Since the launch of the program in 2000, more than 55 Prize Laureates have been awarded the World's Children's Prize.

Oversight 
The World's Children's Prize Foundation is regulated by Svensk Insamlingskontroll (Swedish Fundraising Control), which monitors charitable fundraising.

References

External links 
 Official web page

Children's rights organizations
Organizations based in Sweden
Organizations established in 2000
2000 establishments in Sweden
Awards established in 2000